Lombricine is a phosphagen that is unique to earthworms. Structurally, it is a phosphodiester of 2-guanidinoethanol and D-serine (not the usual L-serine), which is then further phosphorylated by lombricine kinase to phospholombricine.

References 

Organophosphates
Guanidines